The 1977 Oklahoma Sooners football team represented the University of Oklahoma in the 1977 NCAA Division I football season.  Oklahoma was a member of the Big Eight Conference and played its home games in Oklahoma Memorial Stadium, where it has played its home games since 1923.  The team posted a 10–2 overall record and a 7–0 conference record to earn the Conference title under head coach Barry Switzer who took the helm in 1973. This was Switzer's fifth conference title and third undefeated conference record in five seasons.

The team was led by All-Americans George Cumby, Daryl Hunt, Reggie Kinlaw, and Zac Henderson  Cumby was named Big Eight Defensive Player of the Year. After winning the conference title outright, it earned a trip to the Orange Bowl where it lost to Arkansas Razorbacks.  During the season, it faced five ranked opponents (In order, No. 4 Ohio State, No. 5 Texas, No. 16 Iowa State, No. 11 Nebraska, and No. 6 Arkansas).  Four of its opponents ended the season ranked.  It endured its only regular season defeat in the Red River Shootout against Texas.  The Sooners started the season with a four consecutive wins before losing to Texas and then won the next six before their unsuccessful bowl game.

Elvis Peacock led the team in rushing with 812 yards, Dean Blevins led the team in passing with 385 yards, Steve Rhodes led the team in receiving with 272 yards, Uwe von Schamann led the team in scoring with 89 points, Hunt led the team in tackles with 159 tackles and Henderson posted 7 interceptions.

Schedule

Personnel

Game summaries

Vanderbilt

Utah

at Ohio State

"The Kick" - Uwe von Schamann pretended to conduct the crowd as they chanted prior to his field goal attempt

Kansas

Texas

Missouri

Iowa State

Kansas State

Oklahoma State

Colorado

Nebraska

Orange Bowl

Rankings

Awards and honors
All-American: George Cumby, Daryl Hunt, Reggie Kinlaw, and Zac Henderson
Big 8 Defensive Player of the Year: Cumby

Postseason

NFL draft
The following players were drafted into the National Football League following the season.

References

External links
 1977 season at SoonerStats.com

Oklahoma
Oklahoma Sooners football seasons
Big Eight Conference football champion seasons
Oklahoma Sooners football